The Benjamin Franklin Medal presented by the American Philosophical Society located in Philadelphia, Pennsylvania, U.S.A., also called Benjamin Franklin Bicentennial Medal, is awarded since 1906. The originally called "Philosophical Society" was founded in 1743 by Benjamin Franklin. The award was created to remember the 200th anniversary of the birthday of Franklin. The Museum of Fine Arts in Boston has this medal in its collection.

The medal was created by the brothers Augustus and Louis St. Gaudens.

Recipients 

Recipients received this award under different names for different reasons:
 The first medal was given to the Republic of France in 1906.
 1906: Cleveland Abbe, meteorologist
 1921: Franklin Medal to Marie Curie.

Benjamin Franklin Medal
Awarded for notable services to the American Philosophical Society, between 1937 and 1983.

Benjamin Franklin Medal for Distinguished Achievement in the Humanities or Sciences
Awarded between 1985 and 1991.

Benjamin Franklin Medal for Distinguished Achievement in the Sciences
Awarded since 1993.

Benjamin Franklin Medal for Distinguished Public Service
Awarded since 1987.

References 

Awards established in 1906
American science and technology awards
Works about Benjamin Franklin
1906 establishments in Pennsylvania